The Marian University Marching Band, is the official marching band of Marian University in Indianapolis, Indiana. The marching band is the largest student organization on campus and the university's largest for-credit course. Under the leadership of Dr. Sid Hearn, the Marian University Marching Band took the field for the first time on September 19, 2009.

Since then, the band has performed for many prestigious events on and off campus. The band performs for home football games, parades, pep rallies, campus sporting events, community concerts, and private events. Recently, the Marian University Marching Band has become widely requested as an exhibition band for high school band competitions across the Midwest, performing headline exhibitions at various Bands of America events since 2010 including the Indianapolis Public Schools Tournament of Bands portion of the Grand National Championships at Lucas Oil Stadium, Super Regional in Indianapolis at Lucas Oil Stadium, and Finals portion of the Grand National Championships at Lucas Oil Stadium .

History
In 1964, student John Sweany had a vision to bring the excitement that he experienced through his high school marching band to Marian College. With only six classmates and some bargain instruments, John formed the Marian Blue Knights—the first non-military collegiate Drum and Bugle Corps in the United States.  Through dedication and skill, Sweany was able to take his corps to unexpected heights and provide the heartbeat of the campus for 12 years.

During its existence, the Marian Blue Knights performed at:

Holland Tulip Festival 
Indianapolis 500 Festival Parade 
Niagara Falls Blossom Festival 
Kentucky Derby Parade 
United States Capitol 
Walt Disney World 
Washington, D. C.

For over a decade, the corps was the heartbeat of the Marian College campus until it became inoperative in the late 1970s. In 1984, one of the most successful drum and bugle corps in the history of DCI rose from the ashes of the defunct Marian College Blue Knights when the Star of Indiana was founded in Bloomington using Marian College Blue Knight bugles and equipment.

Rebirth
With the formation of a football team in 2007, Marian University president Daniel J. Elsener sought to create a marching band that could provide fans with that "college" atmosphere during games. This simple goal has blossomed into the brightest new program in the state.

During the 2009 season, the band fielded a drum line and horn line. Color Guard was added for the 2010 season, and 2011 saw the addition of pit percussion. In 2012, Marian University fielded its first Winter Guard as competitive members of the MidWest Color Guard Circuit and qualified as a finalist in the Independent A classification during this first season.  The winter guard, known as "Knightro" of Marian University, made their Winter Guard International debut in 2013 at the Southeastern Regional in Chattanooga, TN and was named the 2013 Independent Open Class Silver Medalists at the MidWest Color Guard Circuit Championships.

Unparalleled support from the Marian University faculty, students, and the Indianapolis community, has ensured that the bands program will continue to grow and improve.

References 
 Marian University Bands
 Audition Information
 Marian University Web Site
 Bands of America

College marching bands in the United States
Musical groups established in 2009
Marian University (Indiana)
2009 establishments in Indiana